Church of Our Lady may refer to:

Belgium

Cathedral of Our Lady (Antwerp)
Church of Our Lady, Bruges
Church of Our Lady (Kortrijk)
Church of Our Lady of Laeken, site of the royal crypt, Brussels
Church of Our Lady, Melsele

Canada
Church of Our Lady Immaculate, Guelph, Ontario

China
Cathedral of Our Lady, Shuozhou

Czech Republic
Church of Our Lady before Týn, Prague

Denmark
Church of Our Lady (Aarhus), former cathedral church
Church of Our Lady, Assens
Church of Our Lady (Copenhagen), cathedral
Church of Our Lady, Kalundborg
Abbey of Our Lady, Aalborg
Catholic Church of Our Lady (Aarhus)
Old Church of Our Lady, Roskilde

Germany

 Church of Our Lady (Bremen)
Church of Our Lady, Dresden

Netherlands

Church of Our Lady (Amsterdam)
Church of Our Lady (Breda)

Norway
Vår Frue Cathedral (Tromsø) — Roman Catholic Cathedral
Vår Frue Church in Trondheim
Vår Frue Church (Porsgrunn)

Sweden
Church of Our Lady, Gothenburg

United Kingdom
Church of our Lady: A Serbian Orthodox Church in Halifax, West Yorkshire.
 Church of the Assumption of Our Lady, Torquay, Devon
 Our Lady and St Edmund's Church, Abingdon, Oxfordshire
 Our Lady of Gillingham Church, Gillingham, Kent
Church of Our Lady of Reconciliation, Liverpool
 Our Lady Help of Christians Church, Luton, Bedfordshire
 Our Lady of the Annunciation Church, King's Lynn, Norfolk
 Our Lady of Mount Carmel and St Patrick Church, Oldham, Greater Manchester
 Our Lady of Mount Carmel Church, Redditch, Worcestershire
 Our Lady and the Apostles Church, Stockport, Greater Manchester
 Our Lady of the Sacred Heart Church, Wellingborough, Northamptonshire
 Shrine Church of Our Lady of Consolation and St Francis, West Grinstead, West Sussex

United States
Church of Our Lady of Grace (Hoboken, New Jersey), listed on the U.S. National Register of Historic Places

Other countries
Church of Our Lady of Kazan (Tallinn), in Tallinn, Estonia

See also

Frauenkirche (disambiguation), German shortened version for "Church of Our Lady"
Liebfrauenkirche (disambiguation), German for "Church of Our Dear Lady"
Notre Dame (disambiguation), French for "Our Lady"
Nuestra Señora (disambiguation), Spanish for "Our Lady"
Onze-Lieve-Vrouwekerk (disambiguation), Dutch for "Church of Our Lady"
Our Lady of Mount Carmel Church